Frank II of Borssele (probably around 1396 – 19 November 1470, Den Briel) was a 15th-century Zeelandic nobleman.

He was stadhouder of Holland and Zeeland, but is mainly known as the fourth husband of countess Jacqueline of Holland. He was the son of Floris van Borssele and Oda van Bergen, Lord of Sint Maartensdijk, Scherpenisse (both now districts of Tholen) and Zuylen. He was the last legitimate representative of the younger branch of the Borssele family.

After succeeding her father, Jacqueline of Hainaut's authority was challenged by her uncle John III in the 1420s. In her place, her second husband John IV, Duke of Brabant appointed John III as ruler of Holland and Zeeland. From late 1421 to early 1423 Frank van Borssele played an essential role in the financial government of the county, as he was a loyal supporter of John III and Philip the Good, Duke of Burgundy. In 1422/23 he was alderman of Count John III and official governor of the country.

The height of his power, however, were the years 1426 to 1432. Duke Philip the Good of Burgundy had taken over the position of regent of Holland and Zeeland after the death of John III and on 21 March 1426 Frank was appointed by Duke Philip as General and  Grandcaptain of Zeeland. In 1428 Jacqueline signed the Treaty of Delft, which left her Countess only in name, with Frank van Borssele as the regent of her lands. This gave him more power and more control over the counties' finances. In 1430 Borssele was the Burgundian stadhouder and "Opperhoutvester" of Holland, in the same year he became lord of Gorinchem, Leerdam, de Leede and Schoonrewoerd.

In the summer of 1432, the power of Frank van Borssele reached its peak. Philip the Good, fearful of yet another pretender to the titles of Count of Holland and Zeeland kidnapped Frank and incarcerated him in Flanders. Legend later tells another story in which Frank and Jacqueline of Hainaut fell in love and secretly married in 1432. However, if this were the case, the consequences for Frank would have been far more severe. He would have been executed and Jacqueline incarcerated for life. Instead, his incarceration had to do with the duke being fearful of him gaining too much power. He was released in 1433 and his properties were restored.

Jacqueline of Hainaut and Frank van Borssele did get married in 1434 with approval of Duke Philip of Burgundy after she had formally transferred all her titles to Duke Philip in 1433. This marriage, which was – at least from Jacqueline's side – one made out of love, did not last long. Jacqueline died on October 9, 1436. Frank survived his wife for 34 years.

He remained a loyal servant to the Burgundian duke's and in 1445 he became Knight in the Order of the Golden Fleece.

References
  (Ed.): Les chevaliers de l’ordre de la Toison d’or au XVe siècle. Notices bio-bibliographiques. (Kieler Werkstücke, D 3) Verlag Peter Lang, Frankfurt 2000, p. 99–102.
  Antheun JANSE, Een pion voor een dame. Jacoba van Beieren (1401–1436), Amsterdam, Uitgeverij Balans, 2009, 400 p..

Notes

Borselen
Frank van Borselen
Medieval Dutch nobility
14th-century people of the Holy Roman Empire
15th-century people of the Holy Roman Empire